Ağyazı may refer to:
Ağyazı, Qakh, Azerbaijan
Ağyazı, Shaki, Azerbaijan